Joensuu is a city and municipality in North Karelia, Finland, located on the northern shore of Lake Pyhäselkä (northern part of Lake Saimaa) at the mouth of the Pielinen River (Pielisjoki). It was founded in 1848. It is the  largest city in Finland. From Joensuu, the distance to Lappeenranta, the capital of South Karelia, is  along Highway 6.

As is typical of cities in Eastern Finland, Joensuu is monolingually Finnish. Along with Kuopio, Joensuu is one of major urban, economic, and cultural hubs of Eastern Finland. Joensuu is a student city with a subsidiary of the University of Eastern Finland, which has over 20,000 enrolled students, and a further 4,000 students at the Karelia University of Applied Sciences.

Heraldry 
The explanation of the coat of arms of Joensuu reads: ”shield twice blocked with upper moat and lower corrugated; fields in red, silver and black.” The wave bar of the subject refers to the location of the city along the Pielinen River and the position of the moat near the eastern border of Finland, while its colors black and red are considered typical colors of Karelia. The coat of arms was designed by Toivo Vuorela, and it was approved by the Joensuu City Council at its meeting on May 10, 1957. The Ministry of the Interior confirmed the use of the coat of arms on November 19 of the same year. In addition to the coat of arms, the city of Joensuu also uses a flag based on it, in which the silver of the coat of arms has been replaced by white.

History 
The city of Joensuu, founded by the Czar Nicholas I of Russia in 1848, is the regional centre and the capital of North Karelia. During the 19th century Joensuu was a city of manufacture and commerce. When in 1860 the city received dispensation rights to initiate commerce, former restrictions against industry were removed and the local sawmills began to prosper and expand. Water traffic was improved by the building and opening of the Saimaa Canal in 1856. Consequently, a lively commerce between the regions of North Karelia, St. Petersburg and Central Europe was enabled. At the end of the 19th century Joensuu was one of the largest harbour cities in Finland.

Throughout the centuries Karelian traders have plied the Pielisjoki River. The river has always been the lively heart of the city. Canals – completed by 1870 – increased the river traffic. Thousands of steamboats, barges and logging boats sailed along the river during the golden age of river traffic. The Pielisjoki River has also been an important log raft route, providing wood for the sawmills and for the entire lumber industry.

During the last few decades, the formerly modest agrarian town has developed into a vital centre of the province. Success in regional annexations, the establishment of the region of North Karelia, and investments in education have been the most decisive actions in this development.

The municipality of Pielisensuu was consolidated with Joensuu in 1954. At the beginning of 2005, the municipalities of Kiihtelysvaara and Tuupovaara were consolidated with Joensuu. At the beginning of 2009 the municipalities of Eno and Pyhäselkä were consolidated with Joensuu. After the most recent consolidations, there are approximately 73,000 inhabitants in the Joensuu municipal area.

The University of Joensuu (now part of the University of Eastern Finland since January 2010.) has, in twenty-five years, expanded to eight faculties. The university is one of the mainstays for the vitality of the city and so for all North Karelia. Diversified international cooperation in science, industry and commerce benefits the whole region.

The proximity of the eastern border has been an important factor in the history of the city. The Republic of Karelia is once again a significant area for cooperation with nearby regions in Russia. Export companies in Joensuu continue the pre-revolutionary traditions in foreign trade.

Joensuu offers varied cultural activities. A series of events – Ilosaarirock festival, Joensuu Music Winter, Festival of Visual Culture Viscult, Gospel festivals – and the unspoilt environment increase the attractiveness of the city.

Joensuu is sometimes referred to as the Forest Capital of Europe, mainly because the European Forest Institute is based there. Other forestry research and educational facilities are also based in Joensuu.

Geography 
The neighboring municipalities of Joensuu are Liperi, Kontiolahti, Lieksa, Ilomantsi, Tohmajärvi and Rääkkylä. In addition, the city is part of the Joensuu sub-region, which currently also includes the municipalities of Heinävesi, Ilomantsi, Juuka, Kontiolahti, Liperi and Polvijärvi, as well as the town of Outokumpu.

Climate 
Joensuu has a subarctic climate (Köppen: Dfc) due to its high latitude and inland position. Being quite far inland, Joensuu has a more continental climate than most of Finland. As a result, Joensuu can be prone to temperature extremes both in winter and summer. For example, Joensuu is on average warmer than Dublin or Manchester in July, and colder than Moscow in January. Winters are long, cold and snowy. Summers however, bring frequent temperatures above  and thunderstorms occur typically on 10–15 days per year. In winter, the snowcover is reliable and on average 50–70 cm deep. Annually, Joensuu experiences on average 24 days with temperatures  or colder while temperature below  is observed about once per year. Annual total precipitation averages at 589 mm, with about 225 mm of it falling in the form of snow.

Economy 

Joensuu is a growing provincial center with a service-oriented business life. The concentration of information and communication technology companies has taken place in the premises offered by the Joensuu Science Park. Major industrial companies include lock manufacturer Abloy Oy and forest machine manufacturer John Deere. Research and product development in Joensuu is held at the university, science park, METLA and a few companies in areas such as color research and diffractive optics. The companies that paid the most corporate tax in 2015 were Broman Group Oy, which sells car spare parts and accessories, the key company Assa Abloy Oy, the North Karelia Cooperative, E. Hartikainen Oy, which operates in the construction and car business areas, and Autokiinteistöt Laakkonen Oy.

The unemployment rate in Joensuu on December 31, 2018 was 14.7%. Largest employers in 2006: City of Joensuu (4,409 employees), North Karelia Hospital District Consortium (2,220), University of Joensuu (1,244), Abloy Oy (800), North Karelia Education Consortium (537), Pohjois-Karjalan Osuuskauppa or PKO (512), VR companies (430), Pohjois-Karjalan Kirjapaino Oyj or PunaMusta Media (317) and Schauman Wood Oy (292). In the 2010s, the Palkeet Agency and the Finnish Defense Forces Service Center were established in Joensuu.

There are four shopping centers in Joensuu: Iso Myy, Metropol, Plaza Centrum and one department store belonging to the Sokos chain.

Transport 

Joensuu has a railway station and a bus station, which offers intercity connections to Helsinki and local connections to several other places. Numbered bus service is available to all parts of Joensuu (Route maps, Timetables). Joensuu also has an airport (located in nearby Liperi), with flights to Helsinki.

Joensuu is located along the Blue Highway, which is an international tourist route from Mo i Rana, Norway to Pudozh, Russia via Sweden.

Sports 
The city is known for its basketball club Kataja, which plays in the Finnish first-tier league Korisliiga. Other championship level clubs of Joensuu include Josba (floorball), Mutalan Riento (volleyball), the world leading orienteering club Kalevan Rasti  (orienteering) and Joensuun Prihat (women's volleyball). The ice hockey team Jokipojat plays in the Finnish second-tier league Mestis, and their home arena is the Mehtimäki Ice Hall. The local football club Jippo plays in the Finnish second Division. Finnish baseball enjoys popularity as well and the local team, Joensuun Maila, plays in the top division Superpesis.

Notable sportspeople from Joensuu include Jukka Keskisalo, the European champion in 2006 at the 3000m steeplechase; Aki Parviainen, the world champion of javelin throwing in 1999; biathlete Kaisa Mäkäräinen, who won three overall World Cup titles in the 2010–11, 2013–14 and 2017–18 seasons; 1983 World Rally Championship winner Hannu Mikkola; 2013 Global RallyCross Championship champion and current World RX driver Toomas Heikkinen; and National Hockey League ice hockey players Urho Vaakanainen and Juuso Riikola.

Education 

Joensuu is a city of students. The University of Eastern Finland (UEF) has one of its two main campuses in Joensuu and the University of Applied Sciences Karelia has two Joensuu campuses. There are also five high schools in Joensuu: Lyceum High School, Upper Secondary Normal School, Joensuu Coeducational High School, Finnish-Russian Upper Secondary School of the Eastern Finland, and Pyhäselkä High School.

There is also the Joensuu Sports Academy, which is a co-operation network of educational institutions that offers athletes training and coaching.

Notable people
 Ismo Alanko (born 1960), musician
 Aku Korhonen (1892−1960), actor
 Suvi Lindén (born 1962), politician and former Minister of Culture
 Kaisa Mäkäräinen (born 1983), 3-time world-cup-winning biathlete
 Sini Manninen (1944–2012), painter
 Taneli Mustonen (born 1978), film director and screenwriter
 Esa Pakarinen (1911–1989), actor, singer and accordionist
 Pentti Saarikoski (1937–1983), poet and translator
 Jouko Turkka (1942–2016), theatrical director and controversialist
 Mari Turunen (born 1970), actress
 Urho Vaakanainen (born 1999), ice hockey player
 Floor Jansen, Dutch singer and the lead vocalist of Nightwish, lived in Joensuu between 2014 and 2015.

Friendship cities
Joensuu is twinned with:
  Linköping, Sweden (since 1940)
  Ísafjörður, Iceland (since 1948)
  Tønsberg, Norway (1948)
  Hof, Germany (since 1970)
  Vilnius, Lithuania (since 1970)
  Petrozavodsk, Russia (cooperation agreement) (since 1994)

See also
 Eno, Finland
 Finnish Lake Road
 Ilosaarirock
 Öllölä
 Pielisjoki Castle

References

External links

 City of Joensuu 
 City of Joensuu 
 Pielis.ru – Travel information about North Karelia region and City of Joensuu
 Joensuu Marketplace webcam

 
1848 establishments in Finland
Cities and towns in Finland
Grand Duchy of Finland
Populated places established in 1848
Populated lakeshore places in Finland